Xentrix are an English thrash metal band from Preston, Lancashire. The band were formed in 1984 under the name Sweet Vengeance. They changed their name to Xentrix in 1988, and released four albums – Shattered Existence (1989), For Whose Advantage? (1990), Kin (1992) and Scourge (1996) – before splitting up in 1997. After briefly reuniting in 2005–2006, Xentrix reunited once again in 2013, and they have since released two more albums: Bury the Pain (2019) and Seven Words (2022). As part of the underground metal scene of the late 1980s and early-to-mid 1990s, Xentrix have been referred to as one of the "big four" of English thrash metal, along with Acid Reign, Onslaught and Sabbat.

History
Xentrix were called Sweet Vengeance from 1984 to 1988. The band attracted attention with a five-star rating from Kerrang! magazine, and Roadrunner Records then contacted the band asking them why they had not been sent a copy, and arranged an audition with the band. After the audition, the band was signed to the label and recorded their first album Shattered Existence in the summer of 1989. The band toured with Sabbat in support of the album.

In 1990, the band faced a small bit of controversy/publicity surrounding the release of their cover of Ray Parker Jr.'s "Ghostbusters" theme, in which the original artwork for the single had an unauthorized use of the Ghostbusters logo (with the ghost flicking a V Sign). The single was subsequently re-released using a different cover.

The band also reached new heights when they opened for Bay Area thrash metal band Testament. Later that year they recorded their second album For Whose Advantage?, which gained them yet more interest and their first music video for the album's title track. Xentrix promoted For Whose Advantage? with a tour with Skyclad, and also played shows with bands like Slayer and Sepultura.

In 1992, the band decided to take a different direction with their album Kin, adopting a more progressive power metal style with their music, which was considered by many to be the band's biggest mistake, despite the critical acclaim. A video for "The Order of Chaos" was shot and received some airplay on MTV, and to promote the album, Xentrix went on tour with Tankard.

After a hiatus and replacing Chris Astley with Simon Gordon and Andy Rudd on vocals and guitar respectively, Xentrix resurfaced in 1996 with their fourth album Scourge. The band broke up shortly after its release, citing the decline in popularity in the British metal scene as the reason.

In 2005, Xentrix announced that they would be reuniting with its classic line-up for a small number of dates. They played a handful of shows in the UK in the spring of 2006, including one with then-recently reunited Onslaught and Evile. Despite the positive response to those two shows, Xentrix announced that September that they had once again split up.

On 4 February 2013, it was announced via Evile's Facebook page that a reunited Xentrix would be joining Kreator and Evile for a three-show UK tour in late April. This was initially the full Shattered Existence lineup, but later in the year bassist Paul MacKenzie left, to be replaced by Chris Shires. On 15 February, the band announced that they had new material in the works.

Select shows continued in early 2014, and at the Up The Hammers Festival in Athens, Greece on 8 March, they played new song "World of Mouth" for the first time, and included it in their set supporting Overkill on their UK tour, starting in London on 13 March. In October 2015, Xentrix embarked on a six-date UK tour with a reunited Acid Reign and Shrapnel.

On 14 July 2017, it was announced that Xentrix had once again parted ways with Chris Astley and replaced him with Jay Walsh.

On 27 March 2019, Xentrix announced Bury the Pain as the title of their first studio album in 23 years. The album was released on 7 June 2019.

In a June 2019 interview with Metal Crypt, guitarist Kristian Havard revealed that Xentrix had already begun writing the follow-up to Bury the Pain. By March 2021, the band had written and demoed at least twelve songs for their new album, and announced that August they were in the studio recording it. The album was completed in June 2022, and a month later, the band announced Seven Words as its album title and that it would be released on 11 November. In order to promote it, Xentrix (along with Whiplash and Artillery) supported Vio-lence on the European MTV Headbangers Ball Tour. Chris Astley filled in for Jay Walsh on the tour as Jay was awaiting the birth of his second child in November 2022.

Members
Current line-up
 Jay Walsh – rhythm guitar, vocals (2017–present)
 Kristian Havard – lead guitars (1988–1997, 2005–2006, 2013–present)
 Chris Shires – bass (2013–present)
 Dennis Gasser – drums (1988–1997, 2005–2006, 2013–present)

Former members
 Chris Astley – rhythm guitar, vocals (1988–1994, 2005–2006, 2013–2017, 2022)
 Simon Gordon – vocals (1995–1997)
 Andy Rudd – guitars (1995–1997)
 Paul MacKenzie – bass (1988–1997, 2005–2006, 2013)

Timeline

Discography

Studio albums
 Shattered Existence (1989)
 For Whose Advantage? (1990)
 Kin (1992)
 Scourge (1996)
 Bury the Pain (2019)
 Seven Words (2022)

Other releases
 Hunger for Demo (demo, 1987)
 Ghostbusters (single, 1990)
 Dilute to Taste (EP, 1991)
 The Order of Chaos (single, 1992)
 Demo (1994)

References

External links

The Xentrix Story

English thrash metal musical groups
Musical groups established in 1984
Musical groups disestablished in 1997
Musical groups disestablished in 2006
Musical groups reestablished in 2005
Musical groups reestablished in 2013